Yingjun is a town under the administration of Erdao District, Changchun, Jilin, China. , it administers Sandao Residential Neighborhood and the following six villages:
Heping Village
Weixing Village
Sihe Village
Xiangshui Village
Weizi Village
Hujia Village

References 

Township-level divisions of Jilin
Changchun